The 2013 Masters of Formula 3 was the 23rd Masters of Formula 3 race held at Circuit Park Zandvoort on 7 July 2013.

Drivers and teams
All cars were equipped with a Dallara F312 chassis.

Classification

Qualifying

Race

References

Masters of Formula Three
Masters of Formula Three
Masters
Masters of Formula Three